Rewat Buddhinan (September 5, 1948 – October 27, 1996), nicknamed Ter ( Toe), was a singer, producer and founding member of the Thai pop group, The Impossibles. He was a pioneer in the Thai pop and rock music industries during the 1970's, and the co-founder (alongside Paiboon Damrongchaitham) of GMM Grammy, a media conglomerate entertainment company in Thailand. Due to his influence, Buddhinan is considered to have ushered in a new era in the music industry of Thailand.

References
 Music Trends 1970-1979 
 Rewat Buddhinan's Influence on Thai Popular Music 

Rewat Buddhinan
Rewat Buddhinan
1948 births
1996 deaths
Rewat Buddhinan